The Mizoram–Manipur–Kachin rain forests is a subtropical moist broadleaf forest ecoregion which occupies the lower hillsides of the mountainous border region joining India, Bangladesh, and Burma (Myanmar). Located where the biotas of the Indian Subcontinent and Indochina meet, and in the transition between subtropical and tropical regions of Asia, the Mizoram–Manipur–Kachin rain forests are home to great biodiversity. The WWF rates the ecoregion as "Globally Outstanding" in biological distinctiveness.

Geography and neighbouring ecoregions 
The ecoregion is characterised by semi-evergreen rain forest, covering the lower elevations of the Chin Hills and Arakan Mountains in Myanmar's Arakan State, India's Manipur state, the adjacent Chittagong Hills of Bangladesh, and then extending northwards along the Naga Hills and Mizo Hills to cover most of India's Nagaland and Mizoram states, and also eastwards across Myanmar's Sagaing Division and Kachin State to the China–Myanmar border.

The Myanmar coastal rain forests occupy the coastal lowlands of Myanmar south and southwest of this ecoregion. To the west, the ecoregion borders the Meghalaya subtropical forests ecoregion in the Khasi and Garo Hills, and the Brahmaputra Valley semi-evergreen forests in the Brahmaputra lowlands. The Mizoram–Manipur–Kachin rain forests extends up to the  elevation of the Chin Hills–Arakan Yoma range, and the Chin Hills–Arakan Yoma montane forests occupy the portion of the range above . As the Mizoram–Manipur–Kachin forests extend east across Myanmar, they are bounded by the Irrawaddy moist deciduous forests of the Irrawaddy River basin in the south, the higher-elevation Northern Triangle subtropical forests in the north, and the Northern Indochina subtropical forests in the east. The Northeast India–Myanmar pine forests occupy the higher elevations of the Naga Hills along the Nagaland–Myanmar border, and are surrounded by the Mizoram–Manipur–Kachin rain forests west, south and east.

Climate
The climate of the ecoregion is tropical and humid, although somewhat cooler than the adjacent lowlands.

Flora

In the Mizoram–Manipur–Kachin rain forest, the predominant plant community is semi-evergreen rain forest, which covers the vast majority of the ecoregion's intact area, a total of 36% of the ecoregion. Other plant communities include tropical wet evergreen forest (5% of the ecoregion's total area), tropical moist deciduous forest (2%), montane wet temperate forest (2%), and subtropical montane forest (1%). 19% of the ecoregion's area has been cleared, primarily for agriculture and grazing, and 34% of the ecoregion consists of degraded areas.

The semi-evergreen rain forest is dominated by trees of the dipterocarp family, including Dipterocarpus alatus, D. turbinatus, D. griffithii, Parashorea stellata, Hopea odorata, Shorea burmanica, and Anisoptera scaphula. Trees of other families include Swintonia floribunda, Eugenia grandis, Xylia xylocarpa, Gmelina arborea, Bombax insignis, Bombax ceiba, Albizia procera, and Castanopsis spp.

Fauna

The ecoregion is home to 149 known species of mammals. This includes two near-endemic species, a bat Pipistrellus joffrei, and a murid rodent Hadromys humei. The ecoregion is home to several endangered and threatened mammal species, including the tiger (Panthera tigris), clouded leopard (Pardofelis nebulosa), Asian elephant (Elephas maximus), Eld's deer (Cervus eldii), gaur (Bos gaurus), Himalayan goral (Nemorhaedus goral), red panda (Ailurus fulgens), smooth-coated otter (Lutrogale perspicillata), Indian civet (Viverra zibetha), back-striped weasel (Mustela strigidorsa), Assamese macaque (Macaca assamensis), bear macaque (Macaca arctoides), southern pig-tailed macaque (Macaca nemestrina), capped leaf monkey (Semnopithecus pileatus), and hoolock gibbon (Hylobates hoolock).

The ecoregion harbours 580 bird species, of which 6 are near-endemics: Manipur bush quail (Perdicula manipurensis), striped laughingthrush (Garrulax virgatus), brown-capped laughingthrush (Garrulax austeni), marsh babbler (Pellorneum palustre), tawny-breasted wren-babbler (Spelaeornis longicaudatus), and wedge-billed wren-babbler (Sphenocichla humei).

Protected areas
5.9% of the ecoregion is in protected areas. Protected areas include:
 Barail Sanctuary
 Dampa Tiger Reserve
 Htamanthi Wildlife Sanctuary
 Hukaung Valley Wildlife Sanctuary (extension)
 Indawgyi Wildlife Sanctuary
 Intanki Sanctuary
 Intanki National Park
 Keibul Lamjao National Park
 Khawnglung Sanctuary
 Kyauk Pan Taung Wildlife Sanctuary
 Loktak Lake Ramsar Site, Wetland of International Importance
 Murlen National Park
 Ngengpui Sanctuary
 Pablakhali Wildlife Sanctuary
 Phawngpui Blue Mountain National Park
 Pidaung Wildlife Sanctuary
 Puliebadze Sanctuary
 Rakhine Yoma Elephant Range
 Yangoupokpi-Lokchao Wildlife Sanctuary

See also
List of ecoregions in India

References

External links

 Geographical ecoregion maps and basic info.

Indomalayan ecoregions
Tropical and subtropical moist broadleaf forests
Ecoregions of Asia
Ecoregions of Bangladesh
Ecoregions of India
Ecoregions of Myanmar
Rainforests of Southeast Asia
Tropical rainforests of India
Forests of Bangladesh
Forests of Myanmar

Environment of Manipur
Geography of Mizoram
Geography of Manipur
Geography of Kachin State